Ratwatte may refer to:

Anuruddha Ratwatte (1938–2011), Sri Lankan soldier and politician
Barnes Ratwatte (1883–1957), Ceylonese colonial-era legislator and a headman
Barnes Ratwatte II (1918–2004), Sri Lankan lawyer and judge
Charitha Ratwatte III (born 1948), Sri Lankan lawyer and bureaucrat
Clifford Ratwatte (1927–2009), Sri Lankan politician
Cuda Ratwatte, Ceylonese, the first elected mayor of Kandy, awarded a knighthood from the British, appointed Adigar
Harris Leuke Ratwatte (1900–1964), Ceylonese legislator
J. C. Ratwatte II, Ceylonese legislator
Lohan Ratwatte (born 1968), Member of Parliament representing the Kandy District in Sri Lanka
Mackie Ratwatte, Sri Lankan physician
Mahendra Ratwatte, Sri Lankan politician and Mayor of Kandy from 2011 to 2015
Nigel Ratwatte (born 1990), Sri Lankan rugby union player
Ratwatte Nilame (died 1827) courtier of the Kingdom of Kandy
Sirimavo Ratwatte Dias Bandaranaike (1916–2000), Sri Lankan stateswoman
Wilfred A. Ratwatte, Ceylonese politician

See also
Ratte (disambiguation)
Rawat (disambiguation)
Twatt (disambiguation)

Sinhalese surnames